Young Communists can refer to:

 Young Communists (Catalonia)
 Young Communists (Czech Republic)
 Mouvement Jeunes Communistes de France
 Young Communists (Italy)
 Young Communists in Norway
 Young Communist League, the name of several organisations

See also

:Category:Youth wings of communist parties